Vepryk (Ukrainian: Веприк) is a village in Myrhorod Raion, Poltava Oblast, Ukraine. It has a population of 2915. The local self-government body is the Veprytsky Village Council. After the dissolution of the Hadiach Raion, it was merged into the Myrhorod Raion.

Geography 
The river in this place is winding, forming estuaries, and old and marshy lakes. The T 1705 highway runs through the village. Following this highway will lead to Hadiach. The elevation is 115m.

History

First mentions 
The oldest settlement, which became the basis of Vepryk, arose on the high right bank of the river of the same name. The ancient ramparts, which ran near the town of Lyutenki and Vepryka are the remains of border fortifications that took place here in the 16th century between Moscow and Poland. The town of Vepryk itself was first mentioned in written historical sources of the first quarter of the 17th century. It was part of the Veprytsky hundred of the Hadiach regiment (until 1782). The inhabitants of Vepryk took an active part in the Khmelnytsky Uprising in 1648–54 against Polish rule, in the Battle of Zboriv in 1649. According to the census of 1654, Veprik had 1508 inhabitants, including 700 Cossacks and 800 burghers. In 1658, the town was burned by the Tatars, which was called upon by Hetman Ivan Vyhovsky. In January 1709 the town was was besieged by Swedish forces during the Swedish invasion of Russia, in the Great Northern War. The  commemorates this event.

18 and 19th century 
In, 1764 Catherine II presented Vepryk to the last hetman of Ukraine Kirill Razumovsky.

In 1812, the 9th Cossack Cavalry Poltava Regiment was formed in Vepryk. The Veprytsky Cossack Regiment (commander — Major Tovbych) had at that time 638 men, and 498 horses.

According to the census of 1859 in Vepryk — 545 yards, 4027 inhabitants, 4 churches — (2 brick): Mykolaivska and Uspenska (built in 1823 and 1837) and 2 wooden ones: St. George's and Troitskaya (1787, 1793), 4 fairs were held per year.

In the 1890s, landowners Masyukov, Lishchinsky and Melnik founded the Veprytsky Joint-Stock Company, which became the owner of a sugar refinery, gural, brick factory. Weaving (production of canvas, rows, tablecloths) and tailoring (sewing retinues, chumarok, jackets) became widespread in the town.

20th century 
At the time of the 1900 census in Vepryk (with adjacent hamlets) of Vepryysky volost of Hadiach raion — 930 yards, 7085 inhabitants, 2 mills, 2 parochial schools and 1 school of literacy, there were 4 fairs per year.

In the summer of 1905, peasant unrest broke out in Vepryk, which lasted almost a month. After the investigation was completed, 40 peasants were arrested and put on trial, and the leaders were exiled to Siberia. Several strikes took place in the economy of the Veprytsky Society in 1906. In 1910 in Veprik there were 1176 yards, 7393 inhabitants, there were 2 steam mills, a sugar factory and a soap factory.

Soviet era 
Following the Ukrainian War of Independence and Ukrainian–Soviet War, the village and the surrounding region became part of the Ukrainian Soviet Socialist Republic. In 1923 there were 8823 inhabitants. In 1929, the first collective farm "Krasny Kolos" was organized in the village, which united 24 peasant farms. A machine tractor station was established in 1934. During the German occupation (6 September 1941 to 10 September 1943) 292 inhabitants were taken to Germany, the main street of the village was almost completely burned. In late August and early September 1943, Vepryk became an area of fighting with the Germans. The village changed hands three times.

After independence 
In the 1990s, Vepryk was the central estate of the collective farm "Testament of Ilyich" (meat, dairy and grain directions, industrial crops). An electric substation, social institutions have been built, the economy is developing.

On November 16, 2014, a monument to Lenin that had stood in the village was demolished.

2022 Russian invasion of Ukraine 
The village was at the center of hostilities during the 2022 Russian invasion. On February 28, a Russian convoy was destroyed in the village and a local gas station was blown up so that the Russians could not obtain fuel. The village was not occupied. Russians tried to advanced towards Hadiach, but were repelled.

References 

Villages in Myrhorod Raion